Beginnings is the debut studio album by South African musician and singer-songwriter Trevor Rabin, released in 1977 on RPM Records. In 1978, the album was reissued as Trevor Rabin by Chrysalis Records. It was reissued in 2003 by Voiceprint Records.

Track listing
All tracks composed by Trevor Rabin.

Personnel
 Trevor Rabin – lead vocals, guitars, bass, keyboards
 Kevin Kruger – drums, percussion
 Godfrey Rabin (Trevor's father) – violin
 Gary Edwards – recording, mixing

References 

1978 debut albums
Trevor Rabin albums
Albums produced by Trevor Rabin
Chrysalis Records albums